Bourne Bridge is an historic bridge in Suffolk, England. It provided the boundary mark between Ipswich and Wherstead. The date at which a bridge replaced the previous ford is unknown, but the bridge was mentioned in 1352/3 in the reign of Edward III.

References

Bridges in Suffolk
Ipswich